The Caproni Ca.131 was a prototype for a large aircraft built in Italy in 1934, intended for use as either a bomber or airliner. It was a conventional low-wing cantilever monoplane, powered by a radial engine on each wing and in the nose. The main undercarriage was housed within large streamlined spats. Configured as an airliner, it would have seated 17 passengers.

Operators

Regia Aeronautica for evaluation only.

Specifications

References

Ca.131
1930s Italian airliners
Trimotors
Low-wing aircraft
Aircraft first flown in 1934